Limited voting (also known as partial block voting) is a voting system in which electors have fewer votes than there are positions available.  The positions are awarded to the candidates who receive the most votes absolutely.  In the special case in which the voter may vote for only one candidate and there are two or more posts, this system is called the single non-transferable vote or sometimes the strictly limited vote.

Example
The town of Voterville elects three representatives to the local legislature.  At the election, the ballot paper appears thus:

The voter has only two votes, which they have cast for Brian and Beryl Blue. They cannot cast a third although there are three seats being contested.  Each vote counts as one towards the total for the candidate voted for.

Practice and issues
Limited Voting frequently enables minority groupings to gain representation – unlike first past the post or bloc voting systems. But it is not guaranteed to do this, since the effectiveness of a sectional vote may be altered depending on the number of candidates fielded and the manner in which votes are cast for parties.

For example, in Voterville 54% of electors support the Blue Party while 46% support the Red Party.  Assuming an even distribution of support across the town, the Blue Party would win all three seats with either bloc voting or first past the post, and the Red Party would win no representation.

With limited voting the Red Party would usually win one seat.

However, it is still possible for one party to win all three seats or for the least popular of two parties to win more seats than the other.

It is possible for the Blue Party, even if it is the most popular party, to win only one of the available seats if it attempts to win all three and overreaches itself.  Since they have nearly 60% of the vote, they may be tempted to try to win all three seats.  To do this, they need only to field three candidates. The Red Party, aware of their relative weakness, choose only to contest two and thus to concentrate their vote.

Assuming 100,000 electors in the town casting two votes each, the results might thus be:

By fielding three candidates the Blue Party hopelessly split their vote, despite having a clear majority in the town.

As can be seen from this example, limited voting does not always produce proportional representation.

Another way in which the system may fail to achieve fair representation is if the largest party is very well organised and can arrange the distribution of its supporters' vote for maximum advantage. A historical example of this was the 1880 election for the three members of parliament for the English city of Birmingham. Electors could cast up to two votes.
Liberal candidate filled all three seats leaving the Conservatives without representation. This is despite the Liberal vote being split among three candidates.
Thus the Limited Vote did not produce mixed representation. The Conservative party may have had only about 15,000 supporters and the Liberal candidates may have had support from about 31,000 so the unfairness of the result is not as stark as it seems from seeing 29,000 Conservative votes disregarded. But due to Limited Voting, it could have been that Conservative candidates received one vote from 29,000 voters and Liberal candidates received at least one vote from all 47,000 voters. Judging the fairness of elections results (and perceiving the portion of voters who saw their choice elected) is much easier when each voter has just one vote. 

Total votes cast  = 94,635.

Estimated number of voters who voted = 47,318 (or more)

Eligible electors = 63,398

Turn-out = 74.6 percent 

 Note: Turnout is based on estimated number of voters who voted, calculated by dividing votes cast by two. To the extent that electors did not use both their possible votes (and thus more voted than the number of votes cast divided by two), turnout will be underestimated.

Charles Seymour in Electoral Reform in England and Wales explained the reaction of the Liberals of Birmingham after the limited vote was enacted.

The Liberals of Birmingham realized that if they were to retain the third seat, their vote must be divided economically between the three candidates. 
To prevent waste of votes, an organization must be built up which could control absolutely the choice of the elector; and each elector must vote invariably as he was told. The success of the Birmingham organization, which soon became known as the Caucus was unbroken and no Conservative candidate was returned. It was copied in many other constituencies and inaugurated a new era in the development of party electoral machinery, the effect of which upon the representative system has been profound.

Under single voting in 3-seat district (such as Single non-transferable voting), with the same (likely) voting behavior -- 31,000 Liberal voters and 15,000 Conservative voters -- it seems likely that the Conservatives would have filled one seat if they had run just one candidate. If the Conservative party ran two candidates, it is likely Liberals would win all three seats as under Limited voting.

History and current use
Historic
In Spain for general, provincial and local elections until 1936.
In Portugal for legislative elections between 1911 and 1919.
Between 1867 and 1885 in the UK for some House of Commons constituencies.
In Italy at the end of the nineteenth century.
In Japan during the US-led Allied occupation in the first post-war election in 1946 permitting two votes per voter in districts with ten or fewer representatives and three votes in districts with more than ten representatives.
In Estonia, for the Congress of Estonia election in 1990. 
In Canada in Ontario provincial elections in 1896 and 1900 to elect Toronto MLAs.

Current
In Spain since the restoration of democracy (the end of governance by General Franco) to elect senators from/for the mainland (three votes per voter for four seats per province). 
In the US to elect most municipal offices in Connecticut, many county commissions in Pennsylvania, and some in other states. It has been adopted to resolve voting rights cases in more than 20 municipalities in Alabama and North Carolina, as detailed in Arrington and Ingalls' 1998 article "The limited vote alternative to affirmative districting" (Political Geography, Volume 17, Number 6, Aug 1998, pp. 701–728). In 2009 a federal judge ordered its use for school board elections in Euclid, Ohio.
In Gibraltar (10 votes per voter for all 17 seats).

'Fixed Ratio' or closed-list version of Limited Vote

The electoral system whereby two seats are assigned to the leading party-list and one seat to the second-placed party-list normally has the same result as limited vote with two votes per voter for three seats. It is used for the Senate of Argentina and 96 out of 128 seats for the Senate of Mexico, as well as the Senate of Bolivia until 2005. A similar system was used for the Bolivian Constituent Assembly elections of 2 July 2006.

See also 
 Cumulative voting
 Plurality-at-large voting

References

External links 
 A Handbook of Electoral System Design from International IDEA
 Electoral Design Reference Materials from the ACE Project

Semi-proportional electoral systems